Lee Wilson may refer to:

Sportsmen
 Lee Wilson (footballer, born 1972), English football player and manager
 Lee Wilson (footballer, born 1993), Scottish football goalkeeper for Cowdenbeath
 Lee Wilson (American football), born 1905

Others
 Robert E. Lee Wilson (1865–1933), plantation owner and owner of Lee Wilson and Company
 Lee Wilson (1938-2013), English comedian

See also
Leigh Wilson, American writer